La Femme d'une nuit ("The woman of one night") is a 1931 French drama film directed by Marcel L'Herbier.  It was made simultaneously with Italian and German versions of the same story, which were however not only in different languages but in different genres.

Cast
 Francesca Bertini as La princesse de Lystrie  
 Jean Murat as Jean d'Armont  
 Boris de Fast as Portier lystrien  
 Andrews Engelmann as Portier lystrien  
 Georges Tréville 
 Antonin Artaud as Jaroslav

Production
In common with many other early sound films, the proposal was that three versions would be made simultaneously in different languages - French, Italian, and German - but what was unusual in the production was that each version was to be in a different genre. The German version (Königin einer Nacht) was an operetta, the Italian version (La donna di una notte) was a comedy, while the French version (La Femme d'une nuit) was a dramatic film. This made the process of script preparation particularly difficult. The film's sets were designed by the art directors Boris Bilinsky and Pierre Schild. Filming was completed during about seven weeks during the summer of 1930. Before the French version could be released, the producer Nalpas was forced to sell his rights in the production, and in the resulting financial confusion the film received very little commercial release. L'Herbier also asked for his name to be removed from it when it was re-edited without his agreement.

References

External links 
 

1930 films
French drama films
1930 drama films
1930s French-language films
Films directed by Marcel L'Herbier
Films scored by Michel Michelet
French multilingual films
French black-and-white films
1930 multilingual films
1930s French films